The Fürstein is a mountain of the Emmental Alps, located on the border between the cantons of Lucerne and Obwalden.

The closest locality is Flühli, on the western side.

References

External links

 Fürstein on Hikr

Mountains of the Alps
Two-thousanders of Switzerland
Mountains of the canton of Lucerne
Mountains of Obwalden
Lucerne–Obwalden border
Emmental Alps
Mountains of Switzerland